Vladislav Vladimirovich Myzgin (born 9 March 1996) is a Russian football player.

Club career
He made his debut in the Russian Professional Football League for FC Metallurg Lipetsk on 27 August 2017 in a game against FC Energomash Belgorod.

References

External links
 Profile by Russian Professional Football League
 
 

1996 births
Footballers from Tambov
Living people
Russian footballers
Association football forwards
FC Tambov players
FC Metallurg Lipetsk players
FC Lida players
FC Neman Grodno players
FC Naftan Novopolotsk players
FC Spartak Tambov players
Russian Second League players
Russian First League players
Belarusian First League players
Belarusian Premier League players
Russian expatriate footballers
Expatriate footballers in Belarus
Russian expatriate sportspeople in Belarus